Bill Royce (born July 14, 1971) is a former college football player for Ashland University. During his time with Ashland, Royce set the university record for most sacks from the 1991 to 1993 seasons. He ended his college football career in 1993 and set a National Collegiate Athletic Association career record with 71 sacks. In 2016, Royce was inducted into the College Football Hall of Fame.

Early life and education
Royce was born on July 14, 1971, in Mount Gilead, Ohio. He went to Northmor High School and graduated from Ashland University in 1993. From Ashland, Royce earned a Bachelor of Business Administration.

Career
Royce began playing football while at Northmor in the late 1980s and received a partial scholarship from Ashland. With Ashland, Royce held the record for most sacks per season from 1991 to 1993. He also played in the 1994 Snow Bowl. After his time with the Ashland Eagles, Royce set the National Collegiate Athletic Association career sacks record with 71 sacks. Outside of football, Royce also competed in the throwing events of track and field.

Apart from his college football career, Royce worked as a construction sales representative from 2001 to 2011. In 2011, he became a sales manager for a South Dakota construction company.

Awards and honors
In the Midwest Intercollegiate Football Conference, Royce was named Defensive Player and Defensive Linemen twice alongside Player of the Year once in 1993. He was also nominated for the Harlon Hill Trophy from 1992 to 1993. Royce was inducted into the Ashland University Hall of Fame in 2005 and the College Football Hall of Fame in 2016.

References

1971 births
Living people
Ashland Eagles football players
College Football Hall of Fame inductees